Not So Soft is the second studio album by singer-songwriter Ani DiFranco, released in 1991 (see 1991 in music).

Track listing

Personnel
Ani DiFranco – vocals, acoustic guitar, congas, sound effects, producer, arranger, artwork, cover design
Technical
Dale Anderson – record producer
Tony Romano – editing, engineer
Don Wilkinson – editing
Suzi McGowan – artwork
Scot Fisher – photography
Karen Richardson – photography
Suzi McGowan  – typesetting

References

Ani DiFranco albums
1991 albums
Righteous Babe Records albums